Donald Siegel (October 26, 1912 – April 20, 1991) was an American film and television director and producer.

Siegel was described by The New York Times as "a director of tough, cynical and forthright action-adventure films whose taut plots centered on individualistic loners". He directed the science-fiction horror film Invasion of the Body Snatchers (1956), as well as five films with Clint Eastwood, including the police thriller Dirty Harry (1971) and the prison drama Escape from Alcatraz (1979). He also directed John Wayne's final film, the Western The Shootist (1976).

Early life
Siegel was born in 1912 to a Jewish family in Chicago; his father was a mandolin player. Siegel attended schools in New York and later graduated from Jesus College, Cambridge, in England. For a short time, he studied at Beaux Arts in Paris, but left at age 20 and later went to Los Angeles.

Career
Siegel found work in the Warner Bros. film library after meeting producer Hal Wallis, and later rose to head of the Montage Department, where he directed thousands of montages, including the opening montage for Casablanca. In 1945, two shorts he directed, Star in the Night and Hitler Lives, won Academy Awards, which launched his career as a feature director.

He directed whatever material came his way, often transcending the limitations of budget and script to produce interesting and adept works. He made the original Invasion of the Body Snatchers (1956), described by The Guardian in 2014 as a "fatalistic masterpiece" and "a touchstone for the sci-fi genre" which spawned three remakes. For television, he directed two episodes of The Twilight Zone, "Uncle Simon" (1963) and "The Self-Improvement of Salvadore Ross" (1964), and was the producer of The Legend of Jesse James (1965). He worked with Eli Wallach in The Lineup, Elvis Presley and Dolores del Río in Flaming Star (1960), with Steve McQueen in Hell Is for Heroes, and Lee Marvin in the influential The Killers (1964) before directing five of Eastwood's films that were commercially successful in addition to being well received by critics. These included the action films Coogan's Bluff and Dirty Harry, the Albert Maltz-scripted Western Two Mules for Sister Sara, the American Civil War melodrama The Beguiled, and the prison-break picture Escape from Alcatraz. He was a considerable influence on Eastwood's own career as a director, and Eastwood's film Unforgiven is dedicated "for Don and Sergio".

He had a long collaboration with composer Lalo Schifrin, who scored five of his films: Coogan's Bluff, The Beguiled, Dirty Harry, Charley Varrick, and Telefon.

Schifrin composed and recorded what would have been his sixth score for Siegel on Jinxed! (1982), but it was rejected by the studio despite Siegel's objections. This was one of several fights Siegel had on this, his last film.

Siegel was also important to the career of director Sam Peckinpah. In 1954, Peckinpah was hired as a dialogue coach for Riot in Cell Block 11. His job entailed acting as an assistant to the director, Siegel. The film was shot on location at Folsom Prison. Siegel's location work and his use of actual prisoners as extras in the film made a lasting impression on Peckinpah. He worked as a dialogue coach on four additional Siegel films: Private Hell 36 (1954), An Annapolis Story (1955), Invasion of the Body Snatchers (1956), and Crime in the Streets (1956). 25 years later, Peckinpah was all but banished from the industry due to his troubled film productions. Siegel gave the director a chance to return to filmmaking. He asked Peckinpah if he would be interested in directing 12 days of second unit work on Jinxed!. Peckinpah immediately accepted, and his earnest collaboration with his longtime friend was noted within the industry. While Peckinpah's work was uncredited, it led to his hiring as the director of his final film The Osterman Weekend (1983).

Cameos
He has a cameo role as a bartender in Eastwood's Play Misty for Me, and in Dirty Harry. In Philip Kaufman's 1978 Invasion of the Body Snatchers, a remake of Siegel's own 1956 film, he appears as a taxi driver. In Charley Varrick starring Walter Matthau (a film slated for Eastwood, but ultimately turned down by the actor), he has a cameo as a ping-pong player. He also appears in the 1985 John Landis film Into the Night.

Personal life and death
From 1948 to 1953, he was married to actress Viveca Lindfors, with whom he had a son, Kristoffer Tabori. He married Doe Avedon in 1957. They adopted four children, and divorced in 1975. He married Carol Rydall, former secretary to Clint Eastwood. They remained together until he died at the age of 78 from cancer in Nipomo, California. He is buried near Highway 1 in the coastal Cayucos-Morro Bay District Cemetery. Siegel was an atheist.

Filmography 

Now, Voyager (1942) (montage by)
Across the Pacific (1942) (montage director)
Casablanca (1942) (montage director)
The Hard Way (1943) (montage director)
Star in the Night (1945 short)
Hitler Lives (1945 documentary short, uncredited)
The Verdict (1946)
Night Unto Night (1949)
The Big Steal (1949)
The Duel at Silver Creek (1952)
Count the Hours (1953)
China Venture (1953)
Riot in Cell Block 11 (1954)
Private Hell 36 (1954)
The Blue and Gold (1955)
Invasion of the Body Snatchers (1956)
Crime in the Streets (1956)
Baby Face Nelson (1957)
Spanish Affair (1957)
The Gun Runners (1958)
The Lineup (1958)
Hound-Dog Man (1959)
Edge of Eternity (1959) - Man at Motel Pool (uncredited)
Flaming Star (1960)
Hell Is for Heroes (1962)
The Killers (1964)
The Hanged Man (1964)
Stranger on the Run (1967)
Coogan's Bluff (1968)
Madigan (1968)
Death of a Gunfighter (1969)
Two Mules for Sister Sara (1970)
The Beguiled (1971)
Dirty Harry (1971)
Charley Varrick (1973)
The Black Windmill (1974)
The Shootist (1976)
Telefon (1977)
Escape from Alcatraz (1979)
Rough Cut (1980)
Jinxed! (1982)

References

Further reading

External links 

Senses of Cinema: Great Directors Critical Database
An Academy Salute to Don Siegel, With Curtis Hanson and Clint Eastwood

1912 births
1991 deaths
20th-century American businesspeople
Action film directors
Alumni of Jesus College, Cambridge
Jewish American atheists
American film directors
20th-century American Jews
American television directors
Businesspeople from Chicago
Deaths from cancer in California
Film producers from Illinois
Western (genre) film directors